Morchha (transliteration: Front/Position) is a 1980 film produced for Gopikrishna Global Entertainers by Rakesh and directed by Ravikant Nagaich. This action drama casts Ravi Behl, Aruna Irani, Chandrashekhar, Jagdeep, Jayshree T., Mac Mohan, Shakti Kapoor, Suresh Oberoi.

Ravi Behl made his acting debut with a smaller role in  this movie.

Cast
Ravi Behl
Aruna Irani
Ammi Mahendra
Anita
Chandrashekhar
Ganesh
Jagdeep
Jayshree T.
Mac Mohan
Kajal Kiran as Guest appearance as the dancer in "Ab Ki Baras Bada Juliam Hua"
Mahindram
Mala Jaggi
Pandey
Prem Bedi
Prem Kumar
Rammi
Shahajehan
Shakti Kapoor
Suresh Oberoi
Thomas Lee
Vijaya Bhanu

Soundtrack

References

External links

1980 films
1980s Hindi-language films
Films scored by Bappi Lahiri
Films directed by Ravikant Nagaich